Ichneumon extensorius is a species of parasitic wasp in the genus Ichneumon. It was described by Carl Linnaeus in 1758. It

References

Wasps described in 1758
Ichneumoninae
Taxa named by Carl Linnaeus